Mycetina cruciata is a species of beetle belonging to the family Endomychidae.

It is native to Europe.

References

Endomychidae
Beetles described in 1783